Narathiwat (Malay: Menara) is one of the southern provinces (changwat) of Thailand. Neighboring provinces are (from west clockwise) Yala and Pattani. To the south it borders the Malaysian state of Kelantan and Perak. The southern railway line ends in this province, which is one of the nation's four provinces that border Malaysia. The province features a range of cultures as well as natural resources, and is relatively fertile. Seventy-five percent of the area is jungle and mountains and has a tropical climate.

Geography
Narathiwat province is on the Gulf of Thailand, on the Malay Peninsula. The Bang Nara is the main river and enters the Gulf of Thailand at the town of Narathiwat. Narathat Beach, the most popular in the province, is near the estuary.

National parks
There are three national parks, along with two other national parks, make up region 6 (Pattani branch) of Thailand's protected areas. 
 Budo–Su-ngai Padi National Park is in the Sankalakhiri mountain range. Established on 17 June 1999, the park covers an area of 213,125 rai ~ , extending into neighbouring Yala and Pattani provinces. The main attraction is Pacho Waterfall. 
 Namtok Si Po National Park, 
 Ao Manao–Khao Tanyong National Park,

Toponymy
The former name of Narathiwat was Menara, meaning 'minaret' or 'tower' in Malay, the pre-Islamic name is unknown. This became Bang Nara or Bang Nak in Thai, but was changed to Narathiwat by King Rama VI in 1915. "Narathiwat", from the Sanskrit (Nara+adhivāsa), means the residence of wise people.

History
Historically, Narathiwat was the part of the semi-independent Malay Sultanate of Patani, paying tribute to the Thai kingdoms of Sukhothai and Siamese Ayutthaya Kingdom. After the fall of Ayutthaya in 1767, the Sultanate of Patani gained full independence but returned under Thai control during the reign of King Rama I (r. 1782–1809), 18 years later, and in the early–1800s was divided into seven smaller kingdoms.

In 1909, Narathiwat was fully integrated into Siam as part of Anglo-Siamese Treaty of 1909 negotiated with the British Empire. Along with Yala, Narathiwat was then part of Monthon Pattani.

Demographics
Narathiwat is one of four Thai provinces (along with Yala, Pattani, and Satun) with a predominantly Muslim population; 82% are Muslim and 17.9% are Buddhist. Also 80.4% speak the Patani Malay as their first language. Narathiwat Malays are very similar in ethnicity and culture to the Malays of Kelantan, Malaysia.

In 1963, the Thai government launched the Nikhom Sang Ton Eng Pak Tai ('self-development community in the south') program to move families from Thailand's northeastern and central provinces to the Sukhirin and Chanae Districts of Narathiwat. A total of 5,633 families were relocated to Narathiwat, where each family was rewarded with 18 rai of land. In Phukhao Thong Subdistrict , most inhabitants migrated from the Northeast region. They speak Isan and are 90% Theravadin Buddhists in what is a predominantly Muslim province.

The inhabitants of Narathiwat are largely farmers and fishermen. Narathiwat is an area with various religious places of historical significance.

Symbols
The provincial seal shows a sailing boat with a white elephant on the sail. A white elephant is a royal symbol, and was put on the seal to commemorate the white elephant Phra Sri Nararat Rajakarini which was caught here and presented to the king.

The provincial symbol is the longkong fruit (Lansium parasiticum). The provincial tree is the Chengal (Neobalanocarpus heimii), and the provincial flower is the Odontadenia macrantha.

Administrative divisions

Provincial government

Narathiwat is divided into 13 districts (amphoe), which are further divided into 77 subdistricts (tambon) and 551 villages (muban).

Local government

As of 26 November 2019 there are: one Narathiwat Provincial Administration Organisation and 16 municipal (thesaban) areas in the province. Narathiwat, Sungai Kolok and Tak Bai have town (thesaban mueang) status. Further 13 subdistrict municipalities (thesaban tambon). The non-municipal areas are administered by 72 Subdistrict Administrative Organisations – SAO (ongkan borihan suan tambon).

Transportation

Air
Narathiwat Airport has a direct flight from and to Bangkok daily, operated by Air Asia, departing from Bangkok in the morning and leaving Narathiwat for Bangkok in the afternoon.
It also has Thai Smile from Narathiwat to Suvanrabhumi airport.

Rail
Although there is no direct access to Mueang Narathiwat District, Narathiwat's main railway station and nearest to Mueang District is Tanyong Mat Railway Station, on the Southern Line, in Ra-ngae District. Other major stations along the line in Narathiwat include Rueso, Su-ngai Kolok, Su-ngai Padi and Cho-airong. Distance to Narathiwat by rail is roughly 1100 kilometres from Bangkok Railway Station.

Health 
Narathiwat is mostly served by public hospitals. Its main hospital is Naradhiwas Rajanagarindra Hospital and the province has one university hospital which is Galyanivadhanakarun Hospital of the Faculty of Medicine, Princess of Naradhiwas University.

Human achievement index 2017

Since 2003, United Nations Development Programme (UNDP) in Thailand has tracked progress on human development at sub-national level using the Human achievement index (HAI), a composite index covering all the eight key areas of human development. National Economic and Social Development Board (NESDB) has taken over this task since 2017.

Recent history

There has been growing violence in southern Thailand since 4 January 2004, especially in the majority Muslim provinces of Narathiwat, Yala, and Pattani. Most of the inhabitants of these provinces are ethnic Malays, though the cities are mainly Thai, Thai Chinese, and Indian. Violent mujahideen activity has happened since the 1980s, but this lessened when Thaksin Shinawatra became prime minister in 2001.

Most of the violence has been directed towards the minority Buddhist population in the province.

Religious sites

Central Mosque of Narathiwat
The important religious site for Muslims is the central mosque of Narathiwat. This mosque is on Pitchitbamrung Road, Tambon Bangnark, Amphoe Muang, about 1 kilometer from the provincial town. This mosque is the center for Thai Muslims who come to worship on Fridays. It was built in 1981 in a three-storied Arabian-style building with a high tower and a domed roof as other mosques. The tower is used to call Muslims to prayer.

Khao Kong Buddhist Park
A minority of the people in Narathiwat are Buddhist. Although a minority, there are Buddhist temples in the same amphoe as the mosque. These include Khao Kong Buddhist Park, which occupies an area of 142 rai in Tambon Lamphu about nine kilometers from town on the Narathiwat-Rangae Road.

Phra Buddha Thaksin Ming Mongkol 
The main attraction in this site is a southern Buddha image, the golden "Pra Buddha Thaksin Ming Monkol", which is seated in the lotus position and giving posture. "This mountaintop Buddha image which is considered to be the most beautiful and largest (17 meters wide and 24 meters high) outdoor Buddha image in southern Thailand is decorated in the South Indian style". It is highly respected by locals and Buddhists in the south.

Notable residents
 Attachai Anantameak, actor and political activist
 Naraporn Chan-o-cha, Spouse of Prime Minister of Thailand

References

External links

http://www.narathiwat.go.th/ Website of province (Thai)
Province page from the Tourist Authority of Thailand
Southern Comforts; Narathiwat Province (article in The Nation)

 
Provinces of Thailand
Gulf of Thailand